Vellalars is a term used primarily by various Tamil castes who traditionally pursued agriculture as a profession in the Indian states of Tamil Nadu, Kerala and parts of Sri Lanka.

Freedom fighters and leaders

 Marudanayagam Pillai was the first freedom fighter and he was called the hero of Madurai, he was a brave man who defeated Pulidevar and ruled his territory,Then they hanged him ,the British army cut his our dead body into pieces due to the fear of him. Cut down and buried elsewhere in Tamil Nadu
 Dheeran Chinnamalai Gounder  -Kongu chieftain and Palayakkarar from Tamil Nadu who rose up in revolt against the British East India Company in the Kongu Nadu, Southern India.
V.O.Chidambaram pillai- He was a brave freedom fighter who bought against the British diplomatically by competing their trade operations. He bought many ships of his own and traded goods on his part to compete the British. He is popularly known as " kappal otiya  tamilan "

Politics
C. Subramaniam Gounder  - Father of the Indian Green Revolution, Vetaran Congress Leader, Former Union Finance Minister, Deputy chairperson of the Planning Commission, Governor of Maharashtra. Bharat Ratna (the nation's highest civilian honour) in 1998.

Spiritual & Administrators 
 Arumuka Navalar, born as Kandar Arumugam Pillai, a Hindu reformer

References

Vellalars
Vellalar